Col.(R) Ghazanfar Abbas Shah is a Pakistani politician who had been a member of the Provincial Assembly of the Punjab from August 2018 till January 2023.

Political career
He ran for the seat of the Provincial Assembly of the Punjab as an independent candidate from Constituency PP-78 (Jhang-VI) in 2008 Pakistani general election but was unsuccessful. He received 22,808 votes and lost the seat to Mehr Khalid Mahmood Sargana.

He ran for the seat of the Provincial Assembly of the Punjab as an independent candidate from Constituency PP-79 (Jhang-III) in 2013 Pakistani general election but was unsuccessful. He received 28,681 votes and lost the seat to Mehr Khalid Mahmood Sargan.

He was elected to the Provincial Assembly of the Punjab as a candidate of Pakistan Tehreek-e-Insaf (PTI) from Constituency PP-128 (Jhang-V) in 2018 Pakistani general election.

References

Living people
Pakistan Tehreek-e-Insaf MPAs (Punjab)
Year of birth missing (living people)